Bourbonnais was a historic province in the centre of France that corresponds to the modern département of Allier, along with part of the département of Cher. Its capital was Moulins.

History
The title of the ruler of Bourbonnais between 913 and 1327, was Sire de Bourbon (Seigneur de Bourbon).

The first lord of Bourbonnais known by name was Adhémar (or ). Aymon's father was Aymar (894-953), sire of Souvigny, his only son with Ermengarde. Aymar lived during the reign of Charles the Simple who, in 913, gave him fiefs on the river Allier in which would become Bourbonnais. He acquired the castle of Bourbon (today Bourbon-l'Archambault). Almost all early lords took the name d'Archambaud, after the palace, but later the family became known as the "House of Bourbon".

The first House of Bourbon ended in 1196, with the death of Archambault VII, who had only one heir, Mathilde of Bourbon. She married Guy II of Dampierre, who added Montluçon to the possessions of the lords of Bourbon. The second house of Bourbon started in 1218, with Archambaud VIII, son of Guy II and Mahaut, and brother of William II of Dampierre. He was followed by his son Archambaud IX, who died in Cyprus in 1249, during a crusade. The House of Burgundy then acquired Bourbonnais by the marriage of Agnes of Dampierre, daughter of Archambaud IX, to John of Burgundy.

In 1272, Beatrice of Burgundy (1258-1310), Lady of Bourbon, married Robert de France (1256-1318), Count of Clermont, son of king Louis IX (Saint-Louis). Thus began the long-lasting House of Bourbon, which would provide the kings of France from Henry IV in 1589 to Louis-Philippe in 1848, when France abolished its monarchy.

The Bourbons had concluded an alliance with the royal power. They put their forces at the service of the king, thus benefitting from the geographic position of Bourbonnais, located between the royal domains and the duchies of Aquitaine and Auvergne. This alliance, as well as the marriage of Béatrix de Bourgogne and Robert de France, aided the rise and prosperity of the province. In 1327, King Charles (le Bel) elevated Bourbonnais to the status of a duchy.

Shields and armorial bearings

See also
Sire de Bourbon

 
Former provinces of France
History of Allier
History of Cher (department)
History of Nièvre
History of Puy-de-Dôme
History of Saône-et-Loire
History of Auvergne-Rhône-Alpes
History of Bourgogne-Franche-Comté
History of Centre-Val de Loire
France geography articles needing translation from French Wikipedia
Auvergne-Rhône-Alpes region articles needing translation from French Wikipedia